Brunson McKinley (born 1943) is a Co-Chair of the Association for International Mobility (AIM) and was the Director General of the International Organization for Migration (elected to back to back terms in October 1998 and 2003). 

He was the first American ambassador to Haiti in the post-Duvalier period (1986 until 1989).

McKinley received his A.B. from the University of Chicago in 1962 and M.A. from Harvard University in 1964, both in classical languages, and served as an Army officer for five years.

References

Ambassadors of the United States to Haiti
Harvard University alumni
University of Chicago alumni
1943 births
Living people
20th-century American diplomats